Thede can be a given name or a surname. Notable people with it include:

Thede Kahl, German ethnographer and ethnolinguist
Phyllis Thede, American politician
Robin Thede, American actress and comedian

See also
Thede Farmhouse, farmhouse in Northglenn, Colorado, United States
thede in Wiktionary